Georg Gustav von Arnim (Schloss Suckow, September 26, 1870 – Schloss Suchow, August 28, 1945), 6th Lord of the Fideicomis of Suckow in the Grand Duchy of Mecklenburg-Schwerin, was a German military officer and nobleman, son of Georg Abraham Constantin von Arnim and wife Rosalie Augusta Carolina Johanna Ulrika von Schnehen.

Career
He was a chamberlain of the King of Prussia, captain of the Prussian Dragoons and a Knight of the Order of St. John.

Marriage and children
He married in Berlin on September 26, 1893, Hulda Elisabeth Anna von Versen (Merseburg, March 18, 1872 – West Berlin, May 4, 1954, daughter of Maximilian von Versen and Alice Brown Clemens).

Among his children were Marie Agnes von Arnim (Schloss Suckow, August 19, 1903 – Dresder Weissen-Hirsch, May 3, 1938), married in Schloss Suckow on October 7, 1924, to Christoph von Beschwitz (Schloss Arnsdorf, April 2, 1898 – Wiesbaden, September 26, 1980), Lord of the Castle of Arnsdorf in the Kingdom of Saxony, and Knight of the Order of St. John, who had issue.

References

1870 births
1945 deaths
Georg Gustav
Prussian Army personnel